HC Satakunta is an ice hockey team in Finland. The team has not been active since leaving Suomi-sarja in 2015.

History 
HC Luvia started the season 2008-2009 in the 3. Divisioona, but quickly was promoted to 2. Divisioona. 

HC Luvia survived so well that it was promoted to the 3rd highest level, Suomi-sarja in 2011.

In 2015 HC Satakunta officially announced that they will leave Suomi-sarja. The team is currently not active.

References 

2008 establishments in Finland
Ice hockey clubs established in 2008
Ice hockey teams in Finland